Roswell Records is an imprint of RCA Records, founded in 1995 by Dave Grohl of the Foo Fighters. As of 2004, it is based in New York City. It was named after the UFO incident that occurred in Roswell, New Mexico in 1947. Grohl chose the name because of his interest in UFOs, despite never having been to Roswell. The label was originally set up by Capitol Records as a holding company to retain the rights to Grohl's post-Nirvana music. Roswell's first release was the Foo Fighters' self-titled debut album in 1995. The gun on the album's cover is partly intended as a reference to the outer space theme associated with the names of both Roswell Records and the Foo Fighters. As of 2015, Grohl is president of Roswell Records, which still owns and licenses all of the Foo Fighters' music.

Roswell films 

In 2012, the imprint formed the film subsidiary Roswell Films, which co-produced and co-distributed Grohl's directorial debut documentary film Sound City (2013). The film discusses the historic importance of Sound City Studios and its Neve 8028 console to the world of rock music, along with other recording genres. Sound City debuted on January 18, 2013, to overwhelmingly positive reviews with a 100% on Rotten Tomatoes. After the success of Sound City, Grohl expressed interest to Billboard of doing another production. According to Grohl,

On May 15, 2014, it was announced that the Foo Fighters' eighth album would be released in the fall of 2014, and that the band would commemorate the album and their 20th anniversary with a television miniseries. Each song on the new album was recorded in a different city, featuring "local legends" on each song and lyrics inspired by the "experiences, interviews and personalities that became part of the process." It was later announced the series to be titled, Foo Fighters: Sonic Highways and was set to broadcast on HBO on October 17, 2014. With each of the eight episodes is presented as an exploration of the musical history of a different American city through a series of interviews by Grohl. The group is also shown incorporating what they learned from the interviews into the writing and recording of a new song in or near that city.  The series received equal acclaim to Sound City with the series receiving four nominations at the 67th Primetime Creative Arts Emmy Awards and ultimately winning two of the four.

In February 2021, it was announced that Grohl would be producing and directing a documentary streaming television series, based on the autobiographical novel From Cradle to Stage: Stories from the Mothers Who Rocked and Raised Rock Stars by his mother Virginia Grohl. The series, From Cradle to Stage premiered exclusively on Paramount+ on May 6, 2021, airing six episodes.  In April 2021, it was announced Grohl directed a documentary What Drives Us, on van touring.  It was released on April 30, 2021, on the Coda Collection via Amazon Prime. In November 2021, it was reported that a film starring the Foo Fighters, titled Studio 666 was shot in secret with filming taking place in the same house the band recorded their album Medicine at Midnight. Nearing the end of filming in early 2020, production was shutdown due to the COVID-19 pandemic in the United States. Production resumed in Los Angeles months later, becoming one of the first films to do so during the pandemic.

On December 2, 2021, a sneak peek trailer was uploaded to the band's YouTube channel. The official trailer was announced through the band's Twitter on January 10, and was released on January 11. The film was released theatrically on February 25, 2022, by Open Road Films.

Productions

Accolades 

Roswell Films has received numerous nominations and awards for their productions.

See also 
 Foo Fighters: Back and Forth

References

External links 
 Official website

1995 establishments in New York (state)
American record labels
Companies based in New York City
Film distributors of the United States
Film production companies of the United States
Dave Grohl
RCA Records
Record labels established in 1995